Erechthias lychnopa is a species of moth in the family Tineidae. This species is endemic to New Zealand. It is classified as "Data Deficient" by the Department of Conservation.

Taxonomy 
It was described by Edward Meyrick in 1927 from a specimen collected by George Hudson in November, in a karaka grove, near Sinclair Head, Wellington. Hudson discussed and illustrated this species  in his 1928 publication The Butterflies and Moths of New Zealand. The holotype specimen is held at the Natural History Museum, London.

Description

Meyrick described the species as follows:
In appearance this species is very similar to Erechthias externalla however it can be distinguished from this species as it is much larger.

Distribution 
This species is endemic to New Zealand. It has only been found at Sinclair Head, in Wellington.

Biology and behaviour 
The larvae of this species are likely to inhabit dead wood. The adult moths are on the wing in November. The habitat these moths have frequented is scrub forest.

Conservation status
This species has been classified as having the "Data Deficient" conservation status under the New Zealand Threat Classification System.

References

External links
 Image of male holotype

Moths described in 1927
Erechthiinae
Moths of New Zealand
Endemic fauna of New Zealand
Taxa named by Edward Meyrick
Endemic moths of New Zealand